The 1983 Davis Cup (also known as the 1983 Davis Cup by NEC for sponsorship purposes) was the 72nd edition of the Davis Cup, the most important tournament between national teams in men's tennis. 60 teams would enter the competition, 16 in the World Group, 25 in the Europe Zone, 10 in the Eastern Zone, and 9 in the Americas Zone.

Australia defeated Sweden in the final, held at the Kooyong Stadium in Melbourne, Australia, on 26–28 December, to win their 25th title overall.

World Group

Draw

Final
Australia vs. Sweden

Relegation play-offs

Date: 30 September–2 October

Americas Zone

  are promoted to the World Group in 1984.

Eastern Zone

  are promoted to the World Group in 1984.

Europe Zone

Zone A

  are promoted to the World Group in 1984.

Zone B

  are promoted to the World Group in 1984.

References
General

Specific

External links
Davis Cup Official Website

 
Davis Cups by year
Davis Cup
Davis Cup